The One Hundred Eleventh Ohio General Assembly was the legislative body of the state of Ohio in 1975 and 1976. In this General Assembly, both the Ohio Senate and the Ohio House of Representatives were controlled by the Democratic Party.  In the Senate, there were 21 Democrats and 12 Republicans.  In the House, there were 61 Democrats and 38 Republicans.

Major events

Vacancies
April 21, 1975: Senator Anice Johnson (R-18th) resigns.

Appointments
April 22, 1975: David W. Johnson is appointed to the 18th Senatorial District.

Senate

Leadership

Majority leadership
 President of the Senate: John W. Brown
 President pro tempore of the Senate: Oliver Ocasek
 Assistant pro tempore: Morris Jackson

Minority leadership
 Leader: Michael Maloney
 Assistant Leader: Paul Gillmor
 Whip: Buz Lukens

Members of the 111th Ohio Senate

House of Representatives

Leadership

Majority leadership
 Speaker of the House: Vern Riffe
 President pro tempore of the Senate: Barney Quilter
 Floor Leader: Bill Mallory
 Assistant Floor Leader: Patrick Sweeney
 Majority Whip: Tom Carney

Minority leadership
 Leader: Charles F. Kurfess
 Assistant Leader: Norman Murdock
 Whip: Alan Norris

Members of the 111th Ohio House of Representatives

Appt.- Member was appointed to current House Seat

See also
Ohio House of Representatives membership, 126th General Assembly
Ohio House of Representatives membership, 125th General Assembly
 List of Ohio state legislatures

References
Ohio House of Representatives official website
Project Vote Smart – State House of Ohio
Map of Ohio House Districts
Ohio District Maps 2002–2012
2006 election results from Ohio Secretary of State

Ohio legislative sessions
Ohio
Ohio
1975 in Ohio
1976 in Ohio

de:Repräsentantenhaus von Ohio